The 1st Cavalry Brigade was a brigade of the British Army. It served in the Napoleonic Wars (1st Household Cavalry Brigade), the Anglo-Egyptian War (1st (Heavy) Cavalry Brigade), the Boer War and in the First World War when it was assigned to the 1st Cavalry Division.

Prior to World War I the brigade was based at Aldershot in England and originally consisted of three cavalry regiments, and a Royal Engineers signal troop. After the declaration of war in August 1914, the brigade was deployed to the Western Front in France, where an artillery battery joined the brigade the following September and a Machine Gun Squadron in February 1916.

One of the brigade's early battles was the action at Néry on 1 September 1914 when, acting alone, the brigade defeated the German 4th Cavalry Division. As a result of this action three men from the artillery battery – Captain Edward Bradbury, Sergeant-Major George Dorrell and Sergeant David Nelson – were awarded the Victoria Cross.

History

Napoleonic Wars 

From June 1809, Wellington organized his cavalry into one, later two, cavalry divisions (1st and 2nd) for the Peninsular War.  These performed a purely administrative, rather than tactical, role; the normal tactical headquarters were provided by brigades commanding two, later usually three, regiments.  The cavalry brigades were named for the commanding officer, rather than numbered.  For the Hundred Days Campaign, he numbered his British cavalry brigades in a single sequence, 1st to 7th.  The 1st Cavalry Brigade consisted of:
1st Life Guards
2nd Life Guards
Royal Horse Guards
1st King's Dragoon Guards
As the majority of the brigade consisted of Household Cavalry regiments, it was known as the 1st (Household) Cavalry Brigade .

Anglo-Egyptian War 
Household Cavalry Composite Regiment (1 Squadron each from the 1st Life Guards, 2nd Life Guards and Royal Horse Guards)
4th Dragoon Guards
7th Dragoon Guards

Second Boer War 
The brigade was reformed for the Second Boer War.  During the Battle of Paardeberg, the brigade commanded:
Household Cavalry Composite Regiment
10th Royal Hussars
12th Royal Lancers
Q, T and U Batteries, Royal Horse Artillery

Following the end of the Second Boer War in 1902 the army was restructured, and the 1st Cavalry Brigade was established at Aldershot (South Cavalry Barracks) attached to the 1st Army Corps.

First World War 

2nd Dragoon Guards (Queen's Bays)
5th (Princess Charlotte of Wales's) Dragoon Guards
11th (Prince Albert's Own) Hussars
1st Signal Troop, Royal Engineers
I Battery, Royal Horse Artillery from 17 September 1914
1st Cavalry Brigade Machine Gun Squadron Machine Gun Corps

Commanders
The commanders of the 1st Cavalry Brigade during the First World War were:
Brigadier-General C. J. Briggs (At mobilization)
Lieutenant-Colonel T. T. Pitman (7 May 1915 - acting)
Brigadier-General E. Makins (15 May 1915)
Brigadier-General H. S. Sewell (16 April 1918)

See also

Order of battle of the Waterloo Campaign
British Army during World War I
British Cavalry Corps order of battle 1914
British cavalry during the First World War

Notes

References

Bibliography

External links
 

Cavalry brigades of the British Army
Military units and formations established in 1815
Military units and formations disestablished in 1815
Military units and formations established in 1899
Military units and formations disestablished in 1902
Military units and formations established in 1914
Military units and formations disestablished in 1919